City of Violence may refer to:

 City of Violence, an alternate title for the 1950 Japanese crime drama film Street of Violence
 City of Violence, an alternate title for the 1951 Italian drama film  Love and Blood
 The City of Violence, a 2006 Korean martial arts film